The Beyşehir bleak (Alburnus akili), known in Turkish as gökçe balığı, was a species of freshwater fish in the family Cyprinidae, now presumed extinct.

The Beyşehir bleak was endemic to Lake Beyşehir in Central Anatolia, Turkey. It declined after the introduction of Sander lucioperca (zander or pikeperch) into the lake in 1955, and the introduction of A. escherichii. Overfishing also seems to have contributed to the extinction. The fish was last seen in 1998 and is now listed as extinct by the IUCN.

This was a short-lived species and only grew to 1.5 cm long. 

The Turkish name gökçe balığı means "heavenly fish".

References

akili
Fish extinctions since 1500
Extinct animals of Asia
Endemic fauna of Turkey
Fish described in 1942
Taxonomy articles created by Polbot